Marcel Keizer (born 15 January 1969) is a Dutch football coach and former player who is the manager of Emirati club Al Jazira.

His playing career as a midfielder began at Ajax and was mainly spent at Cambuur, and he had brief spells managing both clubs. He won a Taça da Liga and Taça de Portugal in 2019 at Sporting CP, and had two spells at Al Jazira, winning the UAE Pro League in 2021.

Coaching career
He was technical coach of Eerste Divisie side FC Emmen. He was also the coach of Telstar for two seasons and took the reins at SC Cambuur in February 2016. In June 2016, he left Cambuur and became coach of Jong Ajax.

On 17 June 2017, Keizer became the new coach of Ajax on a two-year contract, after managing the youth side in the previous season, thus replacing the Borussia Dortmund-bound Peter Bosz. After 17 games Ajax was second in the Eredivisie ranking with five points behind the leader PSV, and Keizer was fired on 21 December 2017, after losing a cup match by penalties against FC Twente.

He received his first foreign job on 2 June 2018, replacing retired compatriot Henk ten Cate at Al Jazira Club of the UAE Pro-League. On 8 November the same year, he was allowed to resign to take the job at Sporting CP, with his club unbeaten and in second place at the time.

Keizer signed for the Lisbon-based club on a contract until 2021. On his debut on 24 November they won 4–1 at Lusitano FCV in the fourth round of the Taça de Portugal, and in his first Primeira Liga match on 3 December, the club won 3–1 at Rio Ave. Sporting completed a cup double in Keizer's first season, seizing both the Taça da Liga and Taça de Portugal in penalty shootout wins against FC Porto. He was the first foreign manager to win the latter tournament since fellow Dutchman Co Adriaanse of Porto in 2006. He left Sporting on 3 September 2019.

On 13 October 2019, Keizer returned to Al Jazira on a two-year contract, after compatriot Jurgen Streppel left the Abu Dhabi-based club. On 11 May 2021, he led the club to their third league title after beating Khor Fakkan 3–1; it was his first league title in his career. Keizer would enter 2022 with a successful 5–3 victory on penalty shootout against Shabab Al Ahli and clinching Al Jazira their first super cup title.

Managerial statistics

Honours
Sporting CP
 Taça de Portugal: 2018–19
 Taça da Liga: 2018–19

Al Jazira
 UAE Pro League: 2020–21
 UAE Super Cup: 2021

References

1969 births
Living people
People from Haarlemmermeer
Association football defenders
Dutch footballers
Eredivisie players
Eerste Divisie players
AFC Ajax players
SC Cambuur players
De Graafschap players
FC Emmen players
Dutch football managers
SC Telstar managers
FC Emmen managers
SC Cambuur managers
Jong Ajax managers
AFC Ajax managers
Eredivisie managers
Dutch expatriate football managers
Dutch expatriate sportspeople in the United Arab Emirates
Dutch expatriate sportspeople in Portugal
Expatriate football managers in the United Arab Emirates
Expatriate football managers in Portugal
Al Jazira Club managers
Sporting CP managers
UAE Pro League managers
Primeira Liga managers
VVSB managers
Footballers from North Holland